Legislative Assembly elections were held in March 1995, to elect the 324 members of the Bihar Legislative Assembly. Janata Dal got a decisive victory in the state, political manures ensured Chief Ministers Lalu Prasad Yadav's victory in the chief ministership.

Results
Source: ECI

Elected members

References

1995
1995
Bihar